Below is the list of populated places in Aydın Province, Turkey by the districts. In the following lists first place in each list is the administrative center of the district.

Aydın
       Aydın
	Alanlı, Aydın
	Alatepe, Aydın
	Ambarcık, Aydın
	Armutlu, Aydın
	Aşağıkayacık, Aydın
	Bademli, Aydın
	Balıkköy, Aydın
	Baltaköy, Aydın
	Böcek, Aydın
	Çayyüzü, Aydın
	Çeştepe, Aydın
	Çiftlikköy, Aydın
	Dağeymiri, Aydın
	Dalama, Aydın
	Danişment, Aydın
	Dereköy, Aydın
	Doğan, Aydın
	Eğrikavak, Aydın
	Emirdoğan, Aydın
	Gödrenli, Aydın
	Gölcük, Aydın
	Gölhisar, Aydın
	Gözpınar, Aydın
	Horozköy, Aydın
	Işıklı, Aydın
	İlyasdere, Aydın
	İmamköy, Aydın
	Kadıköy, Aydın
	Kalfaköy, Aydın
	Karahayıt, Aydın
	Karaköy, Aydın
	Kardeşköy, Aydın
	Kenger, Aydın
	Kırıklar, Aydın
	Kızılcaköy, Aydın
	Kocagür, Aydın
	Konuklu, Aydın
	Kozalaklı, Aydın
	Kuloğullar, Aydın
	Kuyucular, Aydın
	Kuyulu, Aydın
	Mesutlu, Aydın
	Musluca, Aydın
	Ortaköy, Aydın
	Ovaeymir, Aydın
	Pınardere, Aydın
	Savrandere, Aydın
	Serçeköy, Aydın
	Sıralılar, Aydın
	Şahnalı, Aydın
	Şevketiye, Aydın
	Tepecik, Aydın
	Tepeköy, Aydın
	Terziler, Aydın
	Umurlu, Aydın
	Yağcılar, Aydın
	Yeniköy (Dalama), Aydın
	Yeniköy, Aydın
	Yılmazköy, Aydın
	Yukarıkayacık, Aydın
	Zeytinköy, Aydın

Bozdoğan
	Bozdoğan
	Akseki, Bozdoğan
	Akyaka, Bozdoğan
	Alamut, Bozdoğan
	Alhisar, Bozdoğan
	Altıntaş, Bozdoğan
	Amasya, Bozdoğan
	Asma, Bozdoğan
	Başalan, Bozdoğan
	Çamlıdere, Bozdoğan
	Dutağaç, Bozdoğan
	Dömen, Bozdoğan
	Güney, Bozdoğan
	Güneyyaka, Bozdoğan
	Güre, Bozdoğan
	Güvenir, Bozdoğan
	Haydere, Bozdoğan
	Hışımlar, Bozdoğan
	Kakkalan, Bozdoğan
	Kamışlar, Bozdoğan
	Karaahmetler, Bozdoğan
	Kavaklı, Bozdoğan
	Kazandere, Bozdoğan
	Kemer, Bozdoğan
	Kılavuzlar, Bozdoğan
	Kızılca, Bozdoğan
	Kızıltepe, Bozdoğan
	Konaklı, Bozdoğan
	Koyuncular, Bozdoğan
	Körteke, Bozdoğan
	Olukbaşı, Bozdoğan
	Osmaniye, Bozdoğan
	Örencik, Bozdoğan
	Örentaht, Bozdoğan
	Örmepınar, Bozdoğan
	Örtülü, Bozdoğan
	Pınarlı, Bozdoğan
	Seki, Bozdoğan
	Sırma, Bozdoğan
	Tütüncüler, Bozdoğan
	Yaka, Bozdoğan
	Yazıkent, Bozdoğan
	Yenice, Bozdoğan
	Yeniköy, Bozdoğan
	Yeşilçam, Bozdoğan
	Ziyaretli, Bozdoğan

Buharkent
	Buharkent
	Ericek, Buharkent
	Feslek Gelenbe, Buharkent
	Gündoğan, Buharkent
	Kızıldere, Buharkent
	Muratdağı, Buharkent
	Ortakçı, Buharkent
	Savcıllı, Buharkent

Çine
	Çine
	Akçaova, Çine
	Akdam, Çine
	Alabayır, Çine
	Altınabat, Çine
	Altınova, Çine
	Bağlarbaşı, Çine
	Bahçearası, Çine
	Bedirler, Çine
	Bereket, Çine
	Bölüntü, Çine
	Bucak, Çine
	Camızağılı, Çine
	Cumalı, Çine
	Çaltı, Çine
	Çatak, Çine
	Çöğürlük, Çine
	Dereli, Çine
	Doğanyurt, Çine
	Dorumlar, Çine
	Dutluoluk, Çine
	Elderesi, Çine
	Esentepe, Çine
	Eskiçine, Çine
	Evciler, Çine
	Gökyaka, Çine
	Hacıpaşalar, Çine
	Hallaçlar, Çine
	Hasanlar, Çine
	İbrahimkavağı, Çine
	Kabalar, Çine
	Kabataş, Çine
	Kadılar, Çine
	Kahraman, Çine
	Karahayıt, Çine
	Karakollar, Çine
	Karanfiller, Çine
	Karğı, Çine
	Kasar, Çine
	Kavşıt, Çine
	Kırkışık, Çine
	Kırksakallar, Çine
	Kızılgüney, Çine
	Kirazderesi, Çine
	Kuruköy, Çine
	Mutaflar, Çine
	Ovacık, Çine
	Özeren, Çine
	Sağlık, Çine
	Saraçlar, Çine
	Sarıköy, Çine
	Sarnıç, Çine
	Seferler, Çine
	Soğukoluk, Çine
	Söğütçük, Çine
	Subaşı, Çine
	Taşoluk, Çine
	Tatarmemişler, Çine
	Tepeköy, Çine
	Topçam, Çine
	Umurköy, Çine
	Ünlüce, Çine
	Yağcılar, Çine
	Yeniköy, Çine
	Yeşilköy, Çine
	Yolboyu, Çine
	Yörükler, Çine

Didim
	Didim
	Akbük, Didim
	Akköy, Didim
	Ak-Yeniköy, Didim
	Balat, Didim
	Batıköy, Didim
	Denizköy, Didim
	Yalıköy, Didim

Germencik
	Germencik	
	Abdurrahmanlar, Germencik	
	Alangüllü, Germencik	
	Balatçık, Germencik	
	Bozköy, Germencik	
	Çamköy, Germencik	
	Çarıklar, Germencik	
	Dağkaraağaç, Germencik	
	Dağyeni, Germencik	
	Dampınar, Germencik	
	Dereköy, Germencik	
	Gümüşköy, Germencik	
	Gümüşyeniköy, Germencik	
	Habibler, Germencik	
	Hıdırbeyli, Germencik	
	Karaağaçlı, Germencik	
	Kızılcagedik, Germencik	
	Kızılcapınar, Germencik	
	Meşeli, Germencik	
	Moralı, Germencik	
	Mursallı, Germencik	
	Naipli, Germencik	
	Neşetiye, Germencik	
	Ortaklar, Germencik	
	Ömerbeyli, Germencik	
	Reisköy, Germencik	
	Selatin, Germencik	
	Tekin, Germencik	
	Turanlar, Germencik	
	Uzunkum, Germencik	
	Üzümlü, Germencik

İncirliova
	* İncirliova
	* Acarlar, İncirliova
	* Akçeşme, İncirliova
	* Arpadere, İncirliova
	* Arzular, İncirliova
	* Beyköy, İncirliova
	* Dereağzı, İncirliova
	* Eğrek, İncirliova
	* Erbeyli, İncirliova
	* Gerenkova, İncirliova
	* Hacıaliobası, İncirliova
	* Hamitler, İncirliova
	* İkizdere, İncirliova
	* İsafakılar, İncirliova
	* Karabağ, İncirliova
	* Karagözler, İncirliova
	* Köprüova, İncirliova
	* Osmanbükü, İncirliova
	* Palamutköy, İncirliova
	* Sandıklı, İncirliova
	* Sınırteke, İncirliova
	* Şirindere, İncirliova
	* Yazıdere, İncirliova

Karacasu
	Karacasu
	Alemler, Karacasu
	Aşağıgörle, Karacasu
	Ataeymir, Karacasu
	Ataköy, Karacasu
	Bahçeköy, Karacasu
	Bingeç, Karacasu
	Çamarası, Karacasu
	Çamköy, Karacasu
	Dedeler, Karacasu
	Dereköy, Karacasu
	Dikmen, Karacasu
	Esençay, Karacasu
	Geyre, Karacasu
	Görle, Karacasu
	Güzelbeyli, Karacasu
	Güzelköy, Karacasu
	Hacıhıdırlar, Karacasu
	Işıklar, Karacasu
	Karabağlar, Karacasu
	Karacaören, Karacasu
	Nargedik, Karacasu
	Palamutçuk, Karacasu
	Tekeliler, Karacasu
	Tepecik, Karacasu
	Yaykın, Karacasu
	Yazır, Karacasu
	Yenice, Karacasu
	Yeniköy, Karacasu
	Yeşilköy, Karacasu
	Yeşilyurt, Karacasu
	Yolaltı, Karacasu
	Yolüstü, Karacasu

Karpuzlu
	Karpuzlu
	Abak, Karpuzlu
	Akçaabat, Karpuzlu
	Cumalar, Karpuzlu
	Çobanisa, Karpuzlu
	Ektirli, Karpuzlu
	Gölcük, Karpuzlu
	Güney, Karpuzlu
	Hatıpkışla, Karpuzlu
	Işıklar, Karpuzlu
	Koğuk, Karpuzlu
	Meriçler, Karpuzlu
	Mutluca, Karpuzlu
	Ovapınarı, Karpuzlu
	Ömerler, Karpuzlu
	Şenköy, Karpuzlu
	Tekeler, Karpuzlu
	Ulukonak, Karpuzlu
	Umcular, Karpuzlu
	Yağşılar, Karpuzlu

Koçarlı
	Koçarlı
	Akmescit, Koçarlı
	Bağarcık, Koçarlı
	Bağcılar, Koçarlı
	Bıyıklı, Koçarlı
	Birci, Koçarlı
	Boğaziçi, Koçarlı
	Boydere, Koçarlı
	Büyükdere, Koçarlı
	Cincin, Koçarlı
	Çakırbeyli, Koçarlı
	Çakmar, Koçarlı
	Çallı, Koçarlı
	Çeşmeköy, Koçarlı
	Çulhalar, Koçarlı
	Dedeköy, Koçarlı
	Dereköy, Koçarlı
	Esentepe, Koçarlı
	Evsekler, Koçarlı
	Gaffarlar, Koçarlı
	Gözkaya, Koçarlı
	Güdüşlü, Koçarlı
	Hacıhamzalar, Koçarlı
	Halilbeyli, Koçarlı
	Haydarlı, Koçarlı
	Karaağaç, Koçarlı
	Karacaören, Koçarlı
	Karadut, Koçarlı
	Kasaplar, Koçarlı
	Kızılcabölük, Koçarlı
	Kızılkaya, Koçarlı
	Kullar, Koçarlı
	Kuşlarbelen, Koçarlı
	Mersinbelen, Koçarlı
	Orhaniye, Koçarlı
	Sapalan, Koçarlı
	Satılar, Koçarlı
	Sobuca, Koçarlı
	Şahinciler, Koçarlı
	Şenköy, Koçarlı
	Taşköy, Koçarlı
	Tekeli, Koçarlı
	Tığıllar, Koçarlı
	Timinciler, Koçarlı
	Yağcıdere, Koçarlı
	Yağhanlı, Koçarlı
	Yeniköy, Koçarlı
	Zeytinköy, Koçarlı

Köşk
	Köşk	
	Ahatlar, Köşk	
	Akçaköy, Köşk	
	Baklaköy, Köşk	
	Başçayır, Köşk	
	Beyköy, Köşk	
	Cumadere, Köşk	
	Cumayanı, Köşk	
	Çiftlikköy, Köşk	
	Gökkiriş, Köşk	
	Gündoğan, Köşk	
	Güzelköy, Köşk	
	Ilıdağ, Köşk	
	Karatepe, Köşk	
	Ketenyeri, Köşk	
	Kıran, Köşk	
	Kızılcaköy, Köşk	
	Kızılcayer, Köşk	
	Koçak, Köşk	
	Menteşeler, Köşk	
	Mezeköy, Köşk	
	Ovaköy, Köşk	
	Sarıçam, Köşk	
	Uzundere, Köşk	
	Yavuzköy, Köşk

Kuşadası
	Kuşadası
	Caferli, Kuşadası
	Çınarköy, Kuşadası
	Davutlar, Kuşadası
	Güzelçamlı, Kuşadası
	Kirazlı, Kuşadası
	Soğucak, Kuşadası
	Yaylaköy, Kuşadası
	Yeniköy, Kuşadası

Kuyucak
	Kuyucak
	Aksaz, Kuyucak
	Azizabat, Kuyucak
	Başaran, Kuyucak
	Belenova, Kuyucak
	Beşeylül, Kuyucak
	Bucakköy, Kuyucak
	Çamdibi, Kuyucak
	Çobanisa, Kuyucak
	Dereköy, Kuyucak
	Gencelli, Kuyucak
	Gencellidere, Kuyucak
	Horsunlu, Kuyucak
	İğdecik, Kuyucak
	Karapınar, Kuyucak
	Kayran, Kuyucak
	Kurtuluş, Kuyucak
	Musakolu, Kuyucak
	Ovacık, Kuyucak
	Ören, Kuyucak
	Pamucak, Kuyucak
	Pamukören, Kuyucak
	Sarıcaova, Kuyucak
	Taşoluk, Kuyucak
	Yamalak, Kuyucak
	Yaylalı, Kuyucak
	Yeşildere, Kuyucak
	Yöre, Kuyucak
	Yukarıyakacık, Kuyucak

Nazili
	Nazilli
	Akpınar, Nazilli
	Aksu, Nazilli
	Apaklar, Nazilli
	Aşağıörencik, Nazilli
	Aşağıyakacık, Nazilli
	Bağcıllı, Nazilli
	Bayındır, Nazilli
	Beğerli, Nazilli
	Bekirler, Nazilli
	Bereketli, Nazilli
	Bozyurt, Nazilli
	Çatak, Nazilli
	Çaylı, Nazilli
	Çobanlar, Nazilli
	Dallıca, Nazilli
	Demirciler, Nazilli
	Dereağzı, Nazilli
	Derebaşı, Nazilli
	Dualar, Nazilli
	Durasıllı, Nazilli
	Esenköy, Nazilli
	Esentepe, Nazilli
	Eycelli, Nazilli
	Gedik, Nazilli
	Gedikaltı, Nazilli
	Güzelköy, Nazilli
	Hamidiye, Nazilli
	Hamzallı, Nazilli
	Hasköy, Nazilli
	Haydarlı, Nazilli
	Hisarcık, Nazilli
	Işıklar, Nazilli
	İsabeyli, Nazilli
	Kahvederesi, Nazilli
	Karahallı, Nazilli
	Kardeşköy, Nazilli
	Kaşıkçılar, Nazilli
	Kavacık, Nazilli
	Kestel, Nazilli
	Ketendere, Nazilli
	Ketenova, Nazilli
	Kırcaklı, Nazilli
	Kızıldere, Nazilli
	Kocakesik, Nazilli
	Kozdere, Nazilli
	Kuşçular, Nazilli
	Mescitli, Nazilli
	Ocaklı, Nazilli
	Ovacık, Nazilli
	Pirlibey, Nazilli
	Rahmanlar, Nazilli
	Sailer, Nazilli
	Samailli, Nazilli
	Sevindikli, Nazilli
	Sinekçiler, Nazilli
	Şimşelli, Nazilli
	Toygar, Nazilli
	Uzunçam, Nazilli
	Yalınkuyu, Nazilli
	Yazırlı, Nazilli
	Yellice, Nazilli
	Yukarıörencik, Nazilli

Söke
	Söke
	Ağaçlı, Söke		
	Akçakaya, Söke		
	Akçakonak, Söke		
	Argavlı, Söke		
	Arslanyaylası, Söke		
	Atburgazı, Söke		
	Avcılar, Söke		
	Avşar, Söke		
	Bağarası, Söke		
	Bayırdamı, Söke		
	Burunköy, Söke		
	Çalıköy, Söke		
	Çalışlı, Söke		
	Çavdar, Söke		
	Demirçay, Söke		
	Doğanbey, Söke		
	Gölbent, Söke		
	Güllübahçe, Söke		
	Güneyyaka, Söke		
	Güzeltepe, Söke		
	Karaatlı, Söke		
	Karacahayıt, Söke		
	Karakaya, Söke		
	Kaygıllı, Söke		
	Kisir, Söke		
	Köprüalan, Söke		
	Nalbantlar, Söke		
	Özbaşı, Söke		
	Pamukçular, Söke		
	Sarıkemer, Söke		
	Savuca, Söke		
	Sayrakçı, Söke		
	Sazlı, Söke		
	Serçin, Söke		
	Sofular, Söke		
	Tuzburgazı, Söke		
	Yamaç, Söke		
	Yenidoğan, Söke		
	Yeniköy, Söke		
	Yeşilköy, Söke		
	Yuvaca, Söke

Sultanhisar
	Sultanhisar
	Atça, Sultanhisar
	Demirhan, Sultanhisar
	Eskihisar, Sultanhisar
	Güvendik, Sultanhisar
	İncealan, Sultanhisar
	Kabaca, Sultanhisar
	Kavaklı, Sultanhisar
	Kılavuzlar, Sultanhisar
	Malgaçemir, Sultanhisar
	Malgaçmustafa, Sultanhisar
	Salavatlı, Sultanhisar
	Uzunlar, Sultanhisar
	Yağdere, Sultanhisar

Yenipazar

	Yenipazar
	Alhan, Yenipazar
	Alioğullar, Yenipazar
	Çavdar, Yenipazar
	Çulhan, Yenipazar
	Dereköy, Yenipazar, Aydın
	Direcik, Yenipazar
	Donduran, Yenipazar
	Eğridere, Yenipazar
	Hacıköseler, Yenipazar
	Hamzabali, Yenipazar
	Karacaören, Yenipazar
	Karaçakal, Yenipazar
	Koyunlar, Yenipazar
	Paşaköy, Yenipazar

Recent development

According to Law act no 6360, all Turkish provinces with a population more than 750 000, were renamed as metropolitan municipality. Furthermore, the central district was renamed as Efeler. All districts in those provinces became second level municipalities and all villages in those districts  were renamed as a neighborhoods . Thus the villages listed above are officially neighborhoods of Aydın.

References

List
Aydin